Simon J. H. Smits (born 13 September 1955) is the former Dutch ambassador to the United Kingdom. He completed a Harting Fellowship at the University of Oxford after which he entered the diplomatic service and received postings to Bangladesh, Geneva, Zagreb, The Hague, South Africa and Brussels as the permanent representative to the European Union. In 2006 he began to work for Royal Dutch Shell, and from 2011 at the Dutch Ministry of Agriculture, Innovation and Economic Affairs. He was subsequently Director General for Foreign Economic Relations at the Ministry of Foreign Affairs.

References

Living people
Ambassadors of the Netherlands to the United Kingdom
1955 births
People from Leiden
Alumni of the University of Oxford